Kukri Hills is a prominent east-west trending range, about  long and over  high, forming the divide between Ferrar Glacier on the south and Taylor Glacier and Taylor Valley on the north, in Victoria Land, Antarctica.

The hills were discovered by the Discovery Expedition (1901–04) and probably so named because its shape resembles that of the Kukri, a Gurkha knife.

List of mountains 
 Mount Barnes is a peak, surmounting the west-central side of New Harbour and marking the east end of the Kukri Hills. Discovered by the Discovery expedition, 1901–04, under Scott, and named New Harbour Heights. It was renamed Mount Barnes after a Canadian ice physicist by Scott's second expedition, the British Antarctic Expedition, 1910–13.
 Mount Brearley is a sharp peak, which is the westernmost summit of the Kukri Hills. Named by the Western Journey Party, led by Thomas Griffith Taylor, of the British Antarctic Expedition, 1910–13.
The word "rahi" is Māori in origin, meaning "big". The name was applied by the New Zealand Geographic Board (NZGB) in 1998.
Discovered and named by the Discovery expedition 1901–04 under Scott.

Other features 
It was named by the New Zealand Geographic Board (NZGB) in 1998 for New Zealand ornithologist Euan C. Young, whose Antarctic research spanned 30 years, beginning in the 1959-60 field season.

The name is one of a group in the area associated with surveying applied in 1993 by the New Zealand Geographic Board; "eyeglass" refers to the eyepiece of a surveying telescope.

See also
Elevation Point

References

Mountains of Victoria Land
McMurdo Dry Valleys